Dolo (Gallo: Doloe) is a former commune in the Côtes-d'Armor department of Brittany in northwestern France. On 1 January 2016, it was merged into the new commune Jugon-les-Lacs-Commune-Nouvelle.

The Arguenon river flows through the commune.

Population

Inhabitants of Dolo are called dulcinéens in French.

See also
Communes of the Côtes-d'Armor department

References

External links

Official website 

Former communes of Côtes-d'Armor